is the 26th single by Japanese singer/songwriter Chisato Moritaka. Written by Moritaka and Hideo Saitō, the single was released by One Up Music on October 10, 1995. The song was used as the ending theme of the TV Tokyo drama series . The single marked Moritaka's final collaboration with Saitō, whom she had worked with since her debut single "New Season" in 1987.

Chart performance 
"Yasumi no Gogo" peaked at No. 5 on Oricon's singles chart and sold 219,000 copies. It was also certified Gold by the RIAJ.

Other versions 
Moritaka re-recorded the song and uploaded the video on her YouTube channel on September 19, 2012. This version is also included in Moritaka's 2013 self-covers DVD album Love Vol. 2.

Track listing 
All lyrics are written by Chisato Moritaka; all music is composed and arranged by Hideo Saitō.

Personnel 
 Chisato Moritaka – vocals, drums
 Hideo Saitō – guitar, bass, horns, synthesizer, tambourine, backing vocals
 Yasuaki Maejima – piano, organ

Chart positions

Certification

Cover versions 
 Runa Miyoshida covered the song in her 2008 album Pure Flavor#2 ~Key of Love~.

References

External links 
 
 
 

1995 singles
1995 songs
Japanese-language songs
Japanese television drama theme songs
Chisato Moritaka songs
Songs with lyrics by Chisato Moritaka
Songs with music by Hideo Saitō (musician, born 1958)
One Up Music singles